Museum of Fine Arts station can refer to the following stations:
Museum of Fine Arts station (MBTA), a light rail stop in Boston, Massachusetts
Museum of Fine Arts railway station, a train station in Gushan, Kaohsiung